Never Go Back may refer to:

Books
Never Go Back (novel), a Jack Reacher novel by Lee Child
Never Go Back, a Harry Barnett novel by Robert Goddard (novelist) 2007 
Never Go Back, novel by Margaret Pargeter Mills & Boon  1977
Never Go Back, novel by Henry Cloud 2014
Never Go Back, novel by Anne Weale Mills & Boon 1995

Film
Jack Reacher: Never Go Back, a 2016 film starring Tom Cruise

Music
"Never Go Back", song from Evanescence
"Never Go Back", by Camper Van Beethoven Composed by Chris Pedersen / David Lowery / Greg Lisher / Jonathan Segel / Victor Krummenacher
"Never Go Back", song by Grace Potter and the Nocturnals Benny Yurco / Dan Auerbach / Grace Potter / Scott Tournet
"Never Go Back", song by Dennis Lloyd